Deborah A. Fellela (born November 16, 1956) is an American politician and a Democratic member of the Rhode Island House of Representatives representing District 43 since January 2007. Fellela serves as a Deputy Majority Leader of her caucus. Outside of her work in government, Fellela works as the secretary to the principal of Robert F. Kennedy Elementary School.

Education
Fellela graduated from East Providence High School.

Elections
2012 Fellela was unopposed for the September 11, 2012 Democratic Primary, winning with 894 votes and won the November 6, 2012 General election with 3,887 votes (64.8%) against returning 2010 Independent challenger Karin Gorman.
2006 When District 43 Democratic Representative Joseph Voccola retired and left the seat open, Fellela ran in the September 12, 2006 Democratic Primary, winning with 1,449 votes (52.4%) and was unopposed for the November 7, 2006 General election, winning with 4,822 votes.
2008 Fellela was challenged in the September 9, 2008 Democratic Primary, winning with 1,148 votes (58.2%) and won the November 4, 2008 General election with 4,469 votes (73.8%) against Independent candidate Karl Tirrell.
2010 Fellela was challenged in the September 23, 2010 Democratic Primary, winning with 1,702 votes (66.2%) and won the November 2, 2010 General election with 2,946 votes (57.7%) against Independent candidate Karin Gorman.

References

External links
Official page at the Rhode Island General Assembly

Deborah Fellela at Ballotpedia
Deborah A. Fellela at the National Institute on Money in State Politics

Place of birth missing (living people)
1956 births
Living people
Democratic Party members of the Rhode Island House of Representatives
People from Johnston, Rhode Island
Women state legislators in Rhode Island
21st-century American politicians
21st-century American women politicians